Lakeside Park Historic District, also known as The Stone Piers, is a nationally recognized historic district located in Lake View, Iowa, United States.  It was listed on the National Register of Historic Places in 1991.  At the time of its nomination it consisted of four resources, which were all structures.  When Civilian Conservation Corps (CCC) Company VCCC 1776 was in town to develop Black Hawk State Park it also developed this municipal park as well.  They built a rip rap berm for a seawall and two piers, and then filled in with dirt behind them to create the park.  Both of the piers are constructed in the Park Rustic style that utilized uncoursed rough fieldstone from farms in the area.  The west pier is U-shaped and extends roughly  into the water.  Two obelisk-like light posts are located at the entrance of the pier.  The north pier is elongated and extends  into the water.  At its base is a broken circle of three stone and concrete benches.  This pier is narrower than the other, and ends with a circular base that surrounds a tapered electric light shaft. The Park Rustic style is meant to blend into its natural surroundings.  The rip rap seawall and the piers appear to emerge naturally from the shoreline.

There is also a brick mineral spring pavilion that predates the CCC-built amenities.  It looks a bit like a wishing well, and marks the site of a popular mineral spring.  At one time it featured a hand pump over the spring's well, but it has subsequently been removed.  The well has been covered with concrete and the pump replaced with a park bench.

References

Infrastructure completed in 1935
Civilian Conservation Corps in Iowa
Rustic architecture in Iowa
Buildings and structures in Sac County, Iowa
National Register of Historic Places in Sac County, Iowa
Historic districts on the National Register of Historic Places in Iowa
Historic districts in Sac County, Iowa
Park buildings and structures on the National Register of Historic Places in Iowa
1935 establishments in Iowa